Sfia Bouarfa (born 14 October 1950 in Jerada, Morocco) is a Belgian politician and a member of the PS. Since 1995 she is a Member of the Parliament of the Brussels-Capital Region and a Member of the Parliament of the French Community. She was also a Community Senator appointed by the Parliament of the French Community since 16 May 2001.

Notes

1950 births
Living people
Socialist Party (Belgium) politicians
Members of the Senate (Belgium)
Belgian people of Moroccan descent
Members of the Parliament of the Brussels-Capital Region
Members of the Parliament of the French Community
21st-century Belgian politicians
21st-century Belgian women politicians